Eden is an unincorporated community in Wahkiakum County, in the U.S. state of Washington.

History
A post office called Eden was established in 1899, and remained in operation until 1935. The community's name alludes to the Garden of Eden.

References

Unincorporated communities in Wahkiakum County, Washington
Unincorporated communities in Washington (state)